In geometry, an elongated octahedron is a polyhedron with 8 faces (4 triangular, 4 isosceles trapezoidal), 14 edges, and 8 vertices.

As a deltahedral hexadecahedron 
A related construction is a hexadecahedron, 16 triangular faces, 24 edges, and 10 vertices. Starting with the regular octahedron, it is elongated along one axes, adding 8 new triangles. It has 2 sets of 3 coplanar equilateral triangles (each forming a half-hexagon), and thus is not a Johnson solid. 

If the sets of coplanar triangles are considered a single isosceles trapezoidal face (a triamond), it has 8 vertices, 14 edges, and 8 faces - 4 triangles  and 4 triamonds . This construction has been called a triamond stretched octahedron.

As a folded hexahedron 
Another interpretation can represent this solid as a hexahedron, by considering pairs of trapezoids as a folded regular hexagon. It will have 6 faces (4 triangles, and 2 hexagons), 12 edges, and 8 vertices. 

It could also be seen as a folded tetrahedron also seeing pairs of end triangles as a folded rhombus. It would have 8 vertices, 10 edges, and 4 faces.

Cartesian coordinates

The Cartesian coordinates of the 8 vertices of an elongated octahedron, elongated in the x-axis, with edge length 2 are:
 ( ±1, 0, ±2 )
 ( ±2, ±1, 0 ).

The 2 extra vertices of the deltahedral variation are: 
 ( 0, ±1, 0 ).

Related polyhedra and honeycombs 

In the special case, where the trapezoid faces are squares or rectangles, the pairs of triangles becoming coplanar and the polyhedron's geometry is more specifically a right rhombic prism.
 

This polyhedron has a highest symmetry as D2h symmetry, order 8, representing 3 orthogonal mirrors. Removing one mirror between the pairs of triangles divides the polyhedron into two identical wedges, giving the names octahedral wedge, or double wedge. The half-model has 8 triangles and 2 squares.

It can also be seen as the augmentation of 2 octahedrons, sharing a common edge, with 2 tetrahedrons filling in the gaps. This represents a section of a tetrahedral-octahedral honeycomb. The elongated octahedron can thus be used with the tetrahedron as a space-filling honeycomb.

See also
 Orthobifastigium
 Edge-contracted icosahedron
 Elongated dodecahedron
 Elongated gyrobifastigium

References

  p.172 tetrahedra-octahedral packing
 H. Martyn Cundy Deltahedra. Math. Gaz. 36, 263-266, Dec 1952. 
 H. Martyn Cundy and A. Rollett. "Deltahedra". §3.11 in Mathematical Models, 3rd ed. Stradbroke, England: Tarquin Pub., pp. 142–144, 1989. 
 Charles W. Trigg An Infinite Class of Deltahedra, Mathematics Magazine, Vol. 51, No. 1 (Jan., 1978), pp. 55–57 
 Contains the original enumeration of the 92 solids and the conjecture that there are no others.
  The first proof that there are only 92 Johnson solids: see also

External links 
 The Convex Deltahedra, And the Allowance of Coplanar Faces

Polyhedra